Tékitoi is a studio album released in 2004 by the Algerian musician Rachid Taha. The title is a nonstandard spelling of the French question "Tu es qui, toi?" which might be pronounced in speech as "T'es qui, toi?" and, in the context of this song, means "Who do you think you are?" informally.

The lyrics are mainly in French and Arabic. The booklet to the CD includes full sung texts in Arabic in romanization with French and English translations.

The album features guest appearances by Brian Eno, Christian Olivier, Kaha Beri, Julien Jacob, and Bruno Maman.

A video clip was made for "Tékitoi?"

On March 5, 2011, the song "Tékitoi?" was used on Saturday Night Live in a dancing French skit called "Les Jeunes de Paris."

Track listing
"Tékitoi?" (Who are You?) - Duet with Christian Olivier
"Rock el Casbah" (Arabic cover version of Rock the Casbah by The Clash)
"Lli Fat Mat!" (What Is Past Is Dead and Gone!)
"H'asbu-Hum" (Ask Them For An Explanation)
"Safi" (Pure)
"Meftuh'" (Open)
"Winta" - with Kaha Beri
"Nah'seb" (I Count)
"Dima" (Always) - with Julien Jacob
"Mamachi"
"Shuf" (Look)
"Stenna" (Wait)
"Ya Rayah"
"Voilà Voilà" (Here It Is, Here It Is) - Spanish version

Charts

Personnel
 Rachid Taha: Composer, Primary Artist
 Leo Abrahams: Guitar (Bass) 
 Joshua Adel: Vocals 
 Kamilya Adli: Choir/Chorus, Vocals, Vocals (Background) 
 Christopher Allan: Cello 
 Ali Bensadoun: Gallal, Gasba, Ney, Raita
 Casbah Boys: Choir/Chorus, Vocals 
 Duchess Nell Catchpole: Violin 
 Francois Delfin: Guitar, Slide Guitar 
 Alison Dodds: Violin 
 Egyptian String Ensemble: Strings 
 Brian Eno: Composer, Drums, Synthesizer, Vocals 
 Adel Eskander: Violin 
 Hakim Hamadouche: Banjo, Lute
 Ashraf Heikal: Violin 
 Steve Hillage: Arranger, Audio Production, Composer, Guitar, Mixing, Producer, Programming, String Arrangements, Vocals 
 Julien Jacob: Guitar (Acoustic) 
 Hakim Kaci: Keyboards 
 Said Kama: String Arrangements, Violin 
 Yahya Mahdi: Cello, Violin 
 Bruno Maman: Engineer, Guitar, Keyboards, Producer, Programming, String Arrangements 
 Anwar Mansey: Violin 
 Abdel Wahab Mansy: Violin 
 Mostafa Mansy: Cello 
 Nacera Mesbah: Choir/Chorus, Vocals (Background) 
 Mostafa Abdel Naby: Violin 
 Christian Olivier: Composer, Vocals 
 Hossam Ramzy: Percussion, String Director 
 Aziz Ben Salam: Flute 
 Dr. Maggid Serour: Qanoun, Quanun 
 Alex Toff: Drums
 Karima Yahiaoui: Choir/Chorus, Vocals (Background)
Source:

References

External links
Official website

2001 albums
Albums produced by Steve Hillage
Rachid Taha albums